Since its inception in 1950, Federation of Pakistan Chambers of Commerce & Industry (FPCCI) has advocated and voiced the collective opinion, concern and aspiration of the private sector and offered helpful advice and solid assistance to the Government in its efforts to promote exports, encourage foreign investment and stimulate economic activity in the country. The FPCCI has its fingers on the pulse of the economy and serves as a bridge between the private sector and the Government.

The FPCCI is playing an active role in presenting problems of trade, industry and environment and safeguarding the interests of the private sector through constant dialogue with the Government.

The Apex Body of Trade and Industry and Chief Spokesman of the Private Sector

Membership

FPCCI has under its umbrella; 59 Chambers of Commerce and Industry, 17 Women’s Chambers of Commerce & Industry, 9 Chambers of Small Traders, 130 All Pakistan Trade Associations, and 7 Joint Chambers of Commerce representing Industry, Trade and Service sectors across Pakistan.

FPCCI offices
Federation Offices and its standing committees have the presence in all four provincial headquarters namely in Lahore, Peshawar, Quetta, including its Capital House at Islamabad to serve the interest of the business community at micro level.

International affiliations
 Confederation of Asia Pacific Chambers of Commerce & Industry (CACCI)
 Islamic Chamber of Commerce, Industry & Agriculture (ICCIA)
 ECO Chamber of Commerce & Industry (ECO CCI)
 SAARC Chamber of Commerce & Industry (SAARC CCI)
 D-8 Federation of Chambers of Commerce & Industry

Office bearers

See also
Pakistan Ministry of Commerce
Planning Commission (Pakistan)
International Chamber of Commerce
China Chamber of International Commerce
Union of Chambers and Commodity Exchanges of Turkey
United States Chamber of Commerce
Federation of Indian Chambers of Commerce & Industry

References

External links
 Federation of Pakistan Chambers of Commerce & Industry'''

Chambers of commerce in Pakistan
Chambers of commerce
Federations
Organizations established in 1950
Non-profit organisations based in Pakistan